Rumeshkhan Rural District is a rural district (dehestan) in the Central District of Rumeshkhan County, Lorestan Province, Iran. At the 2006 census, its population was 3,601, living in 716 households.  The rural district has five villages:
 Choqapur Aliabad
 Lalvand
 Mahki
 Mohammadabad-e Garavand
 Rahmanabad-e Zagheh-ye Lalvand

References 

Rumeshkhan County
Rural Districts of Lorestan Province